Janvry is the name of two communes in France:
 Janvry, Marne
 Janvry, Essonne